Santiago Pérez can refer to:

Santiago Pérez de Manosalbas (1830-1900), President of Colombia
Santiago Pérez (racewalker) (born 1972), Spanish racewalker
Santiago Pérez (baseball) (born 1975), Dominican baseball players
Santiago Pérez (cyclist) (born 1977), Spanish cyclist
Santiago Pérez (footballer) (born 1998), Uruguayan footballer